Cliff Richard is a British singer and actor.

Cliff Richard or Richards may also refer to:

Cliff Richard and the Shadows, a musical formation with Cliff Richard as lead singer and The Shadows as his backing band
Reunited – Cliff Richard and The Shadows, a 2009 studio album by British pop singer Cliff Richard and his original backing band The Shadows
Cliff Richard (1965 album), a self-titled album by Cliff Richard
Cliff Richards (born 1964), Brazilian comic book artist
Cliff Richards (rugby union) (1901–1964), Welsh international rugby union wing